Martha Loftin Wilson (Loftin; January 18, 1834 – June 11, 1919) was an American missionary worker and journal editor, as well as a pioneer Atlanta resident and a heroine of the American Civil War. She was regarded as "the most influential leader in the Woman's Missionary Union in Georgia". Wilson was the author of Hospital Scenes and Incidents of the War.

Early life and education
Martha Eleanor Loftin was born in Clarke County, Alabama, January 18, 1834. She was a Baptist from early childhood, having been baptized in 1845.

She was educated in the Dayton Masonic Institute in Alabama.

Career
On November 14, 1850, she married John Stainback Wilson, M.D. During the civil war, she worked in the hospitals of Richmond, Virginia, Camp Winder, and Camp Jackson, with her husband, who was a surgeon. At that time, she wrote a book, Hospital Scenes and Incidents of the War, which was in the hands of the publishers, with the provision that the proceeds should go to the sick and wounded. The manuscript was burned in the fall of Columbia, South Carolina. A part of the original manuscript was deposited in the cornerstone of the Confederate Home, in Atlanta. Dr. and Mrs. Wilson were in the Battle of Jonesborough, where Sherman captured part of the command, and the badly wounded were sent under Dr. and Mrs. Wilson's care to Macon, Georgia, and those not injured to northern prisons.

Her career was associated with the duties of corresponding secretary of the central committee of the Woman's Baptist Missionary Union of Georgia. The central committee was organized by the home and foreign boards of the Southern Baptist Convention, November 19, 1878, in Atlanta, with Wilson as president. She also served as the Georgia editor of the Baptist Basket, a missionary journal published in Louisville, Kentucky.
Wilson was for some time president of the Southside Woman's Christian Temperance Union and of the Woman's Christian Association of Atlanta, both of which she aided in organizing. At the same time, she taught an infant class of 60 to 75 in her church's Sunday school. Although her husband died on August 2, 1892, her work went on without interruption.

Personal life

Wilson had been a member of the Second Baptist church from early childhood, and was always connected with the institutions of the denomination. She died June 11, 1919, in Atlanta, and was buried in that city's Oakland Cemetery. She was survived by her daughter and three of her five sons.

Selected works
 Hospital Scenes and Incidents of the War

References

Attribution

Bibliography

Further reading
 Weaver, C. Douglas, 2002. "From Saint to Sinner: Missionary Pioneer to Gospel Mission Convert: The Legacy of Martha Loftin Wilson", Viewpoints: Georgia Baptist History, pp. 71–85

External links

1834 births
1919 deaths
Baptist missionaries from the United States
American magazine editors
Women magazine editors
People from Clarke County, Alabama
19th-century American women writers
19th-century American writers
Wikipedia articles incorporating text from A Woman of the Century
Baptist missionaries in the United States
Female Christian missionaries
19th-century Baptists